Manoel Fredrick Santos (30 January 1935 – 21 June 2020) was an Australian weightlifter. A middle-heavyweight lifter, he competed at the 1956 Summer Olympics in Melbourne and the 1960 Summer Olympics in Rome.

References

External links
 

1935 births
2020 deaths
Australian male weightlifters
Olympic weightlifters of Australia
Weightlifters at the 1956 Summer Olympics
Weightlifters at the 1960 Summer Olympics
Commonwealth Games medallists in weightlifting
Commonwealth Games gold medallists for Australia
Weightlifters at the 1958 British Empire and Commonwealth Games
Sportspeople from Sydney
20th-century Australian people
Medallists at the 1958 British Empire and Commonwealth Games